Hayfield is a census-designated place (CDP) in Fairfax County, Virginia, United States. The population as of the 2010 census was 3,909.

It is located in southeastern Fairfax County, bordered by Kingstowne to the northwest, Rose Hill to the north, Groveton to the east, and Fort Belvoir to the south. The main road through Hayfield is Telegraph Road, which leads northeast  into Alexandria and southwest  to U.S. Route 1 at Pohick. About a fifth of the area is taken up by the United States Coast Guard Navigation Center.

Education
Fairfax County Public Schools operates public schools. Hayfield Secondary School has served the area since 1968. There is also Hayfield Elementary directly across Telegraph Road from the secondary school.

References

External links
 https://www.navcen.uscg.gov/

Census-designated places in Fairfax County, Virginia
Washington metropolitan area
Census-designated places in Virginia